The Belleview Post Office, at 6256 Main St. in Belleview, Kentucky, was built around 1880.  It has also been known as the Grant Post Office.  It was listed on the National Register of Historic Places in 1990.

The building was used as a basket shop in the late 1800s, and then as a doctor's office.  It served as a post office from around 1920 until 1970. The building was moved to 6235 Sycamore St., where it currently stands.

References

National Register of Historic Places in Boone County, Kentucky
Gothic Revival architecture in Kentucky
Commercial buildings completed in 1880
1880 establishments in Kentucky
Post office buildings on the National Register of Historic Places in Kentucky